Edward Earl "Jack" Nason  aka Running Deer (April 8, 1899 - March 9, 1977) was a professional football player who played in the National Football League during the 1922 and 1923 seasons. He joined the NFL's Oorang Indians. The Indians were a team based in LaRue, Ohio, composed only of Native Americans, and coached by Jim Thorpe.

References

Uniform Numbers of the NFL

1899 births
1977 deaths
American football tackles
Native American players of American football
Oorang Indians players
Players of American football from Kansas
Sportspeople from Topeka, Kansas